Molotovabad may refer to:

 Molotovabad, Kyrgyzstan, Soviet name of Uch-Korgon, Kyrgyzstan
 Molotovabad, Tajikistan, Soviet name of Dusty, Tajikistan